Troubleshooter is the third extended play by South Korean girl group Kep1er. It was released by Wake One Entertainment on October 13, 2022, and contains five tracks, including the lead single "We Fresh".

Background and release
On September 26, Wake One Entertainment announced Kep1er would be releasing their third extended play titled Troubleshooter on October 13. A day later, the promotional schedule was released. On September 28, the track listing was released with "We Fresh" announced as the lead single. On October 7, the highlight medley teaser video was released.  A day later, the mood film teaser video was released. Music video teasers for "We Fresh" were released on October 11 and 12.

Commercial performance
On the day of its release alone, the EP sold more than 167,000 copies, breaking Kep1er's own record of 153,000 first-day sales achieved with their second EP Doublast.

Troubleshooter debuted at number 2 on South Korea's Circle Album Chart in the chart issue dated October 10–15, with more than 240,000 copies sold, and number 21 on Billboard Japan's Hot 100 in the chart issue dated October 19.

Promotion
Prior to the release of Troubleshooter, on October 10, 2022, the group held their first fan meeting called "2022 Kep1er Fan Meeting 'Kep1anet'" where they performed "Dreams".

Track listing

Charts

Weekly charts

Monthly charts

Year-end chart

Sales and certifications

Release history

References

External links
  at Wake One Entertainment

Kep1er albums
2022 EPs
Korean-language EPs
Wake One Entertainment EPs